Frank Porter may refer to:
 Frank Porter (cricketer), South African cricketer
 Frank Addison Porter, American pianist and composer
 Frank B. Porter, Pioneer businessman and real estate developer of Monterey Peninsula

See also